Happy Sisters is a 2017 South Korean television series starring Shim Yi-young, Han Young, Oh Dae-gyu, Kang Seo-joon, Lee Shi-kang, and Ban So-young. The series airs daily on SBS from 8:30 a.m. to 9:10 a.m. (KST).

Plot
A TV series depicting how women who live in our times are searching for their identity through beautiful and intense love.

Cast

Main
 Shim Yi-young as Yoon Ye-eun
 Han Young as Yoon Sang-eun
 Oh Dae-gyu as Choi Jae-woong
 Kang Seo-joon as Lee Jin-seop
 Lee Shi-kang as Min Hyung-joo
 Ban So-young as Jo Hwa-young

Supporting

People around Lee Jin-seop
 Im Chae-moo as Lee Sung-pil
 Kim Seon-hwa as Jin Mal-shim
 Oh Young-shil as Yang Hye-jung
 Heo Eun-jung as Lee Se-ran
 Lee Ye-bin as Lee Byung-sook

People around Joo Man-bok
 Kim Dong-gyun as Joo Man-bok
 Bo Ra-na as Go Da-hong
 Lee Sang-mi as Kang Deok-ja
 Lee Sung-uk as Hwang Soo-chan
 Go Na-hee as Hwang Soo-ji

Others
 Kim Young-im as Na Seung-mi
 Sung Doo-seop as Cha Do-hoon
 Jung Geun as Gong Il-sam
 Kim Ha-rim as Noh Yoo-ra
 Lee Young-eun as Choi Jin-hee
 Seo Jung-woo as Cha bi-seo
 Min Joon-hyun
 Lee Seol-goo

Original soundtrack

Part 1

Part 2

Part 3

Ratings 
In this table,  represent the lowest ratings and  represent the highest ratings.
NR denotes that the drama did not rank in the top 20 daily programs on that date.
N/A denotes that the rating is not known.

Awards and nominations

Notes

References

External links
  

Seoul Broadcasting System television dramas
2017 South Korean television series debuts
Korean-language television shows
South Korean romance television series
South Korean melodrama television series
2018 South Korean television series endings